Fang Ziyi (21 January 1917 – 17 March 2015) was a major general in the People's Liberation Army Air Force of China. He served as Deputy Commander of the Air Force of Beijing Military Region and Deputy Commander of the Air Force of Guangzhou Military Region, and adviser of PLA Air Force Aviation University.

Biography
Fang was born Fang Taixing in Guoziyuan Township of Jinzhai County, in Anhui province, on January 21, 1917, during the Republic of China.

He joined the Chinese Workers' and Peasants' Red Army in 1930, the Communist Youth League of China in 1931, and the Communist Party of China in 1933. During the Chinese Civil War, he took part in the Long March. He served as a student in Flight Training Class of Xinjiang Air Force during the Second Sino-Japanese War. He served as the team leader of Eight Route Army General Headquarters Air Force, section chief of Flight Training Department, and political commissar of the Fighter Air Group in the Chinese Communist Revolution. He shot down or damaged 88 American planes with his army in the Korean War.

He was awarded the rank of Major General (shao jiang) in 1955. 

He was awarded Order of Bayi, Order of Independence and Freedom, Order of Liberation, and Red Heart Order. 

He served as Deputy Commander of the Air Force of Beijing Military Region and Deputy Commander of the Air Force of Guangzhou Military Region, and adviser of PLA Air Force Aviation University.

On March 17, 2015, Fang Ziyi died of an illness in Beijing.

References

1917 births
2015 deaths
People's Liberation Army generals from Anhui
People from Jinzhai County
People's Liberation Army Air Force generals
Chinese military personnel of the Korean War